Collinwood High School is a public high school located in Collinwood, Tennessee, United States.  It is part of the Wayne County School System.

External links
Collinwood High School
Collinwood High School Sports

Schools in Wayne County, Tennessee
Public high schools in Tennessee